The Yanwu Expressway, also known as the Yan'an-Wuqi Expressway, or the Yan'an-Zhidan-Wuqi Expressway, or Shaanxi Provincial Expressway S16 is an expressway in Yan'an, Shaanxi, China. The route traverses the hills of the Loess Plateau in the Shaanbei region, beginning at an interchange with the G65 Baotou-Maoming Expressway in the town of Yanhewan in Ansai District, and travelling through Zhidan County to its terminus in Wuqi County. Construction started in on December 14, 2008, and on December 19, 2013, construction was completed, and the expressway was opened to traffic. Upon its completion, it became Shaanxi's longest provincial highway by mileage.

Design 
The expressway traverses a total of 202 bridges and 10 tunnels, accounting for 57.2% of the route's total length. Initially, the route was planned to open by the end of 2011, and cost 10.495 billion RMB. Later, its completion date was pushed back to 2012, and its projected total cost was raised to 10.785 billion RMB.

Route

References 

Expressways in Shaanxi